El Morro National Monument is a U.S. national monument in Cibola County, New Mexico, United States. Located on an ancient east–west trail in the western part of the state, the monument preserves the remains of a large prehistoric pueblo atop a great sandstone promontory with a pool of water at its base, which subsequently became a landmark where over the centuries explorers and travelers have left personal inscriptions that survive today.

Between about 1275 to 1350 AD, up to 600 people of the Ancestral Puebloan culture lived in the 355+-room mesa-top pueblo. The village was situated on the old Zuni-Acoma Trail, an important ancient trade route. Spanish explorers visiting the area in the 16th century referred to the notable promontory as El Morro ("The Headland"); the local Zuni Indians call it A'ts'ina ("Place of writings on the rock"), and early Anglo-Americans referred to it as Inscription Rock.

With its oasis-like source of water, El Morro served as a natural resting place for numerous travelers through the otherwise arid and desolate region, many of whom left their signatures, names, dates, and stories of their treks in the walls of the sandstone cliff. While some of the inscriptions are now faded through age, there are still many that can be seen today and remain legible, with some dating back to the 17th century. The oldest legible  inscription at El Morro, left by Juan de Oñate, the first Spanish governor of the colony of Santa Fe de Nuevo México, is dated April 16, 1605. Among the Anglo-American emigrants who left their names there in 1858 were several members of the Rose-Baley Party, including Leonard Rose and John Udell. Nearby petroglyphs and carvings made by the Ancestral Puebloans were inscribed centuries before Europeans arrived. In 1906, U.S. federal law prohibited further carving on the cliffs.

El Morro was designated a national monument by President Theodore Roosevelt on December 8, 1906, and was added to the National Register of Historic Places in 1966. Today the site is managed by the National Park Service. The many inscription panels, water pool, pueblo ruins, and the top of the promontory are all accessible via park trails. El Morro is one of many prehistoric sites on the Trails of the Ancients Byway, a designated New Mexico Scenic Byway. The monument was featured in the film Four Faces West (1948), starring Joel McCrea. In December 2019, the International Dark Sky Association certified El Morro as an International Dark Sky Park, recognizing its preservation of not only the historic inscriptions but also its natural night sky.

Gallery

See also

National Register of Historic Places listings in Cibola County, New Mexico
List of National Monuments of the United States

References

United States Government Printing Office (1995). El Morro National Monument. GPO 387-038/00173

External links

Official National Park Service site
American Southwest, a National Park Service Discover Our Shared Heritage Travel Itinerary
Woodpecker Arch, an unusual feature at El Morro Rock. Photos and directions at Atlas Obscura.

Petroglyphs in New Mexico
National Park Service National Monuments in New Mexico
Museums in Cibola County, New Mexico
Native American museums in New Mexico
Protected areas established in 1906
Protected areas of Cibola County, New Mexico
Historic districts on the National Register of Historic Places in New Mexico
1906 establishments in New Mexico Territory